Doris fontainii is a species of sea slug, a dorid nudibranch, a marine gastropod mollusk in the family Dorididae.

Distribution
This species was described from Chile. It has been reported from northern Argentina southwards on the Atlantic Ocean coast of South America and from Peru southwards on the Pacific coast of South America. It is also recorded from Tristan da Cunha.

References

Dorididae
Gastropods described in 1837